Mohammad Mohebi (born 20 December 1998) is an Iranian professional footballer who plays as a winger for Persian Gulf Pro League club Esteghlal.

Club career

Sepahan
He made his debut for Sepahan in first fixtures of 2019–20 Iran Pro League against his former team, Shahin Bushehr, and scored first goal of match.

Santa Clara
On 24 August 2021, Mohebi joined Primeira Liga side Santa Clara on a three-year deal with Shahriyar Moghanlou moving in the opposite direction.

International career
He made his debut against Cambodia in a 2022 FIFA World Cup qualification match on 10 October 2019, in which he scored two goals and had two assists on his debut.

International goals
Scores and results list Iran's goal tally first.

Career statistics
Last Update:7 September 2019

Honours 
Sepahan

Iran Pro League: Runner-up 2020–21
'''Esteghlal 

Iranian Super Cup:  2022

References

External links
 

1998 births
People from Bushehr
Living people
Association football forwards
Iranian footballers
Iran international footballers
Sepahan S.C. footballers
Shahin Bushehr F.C. players
C.D. Santa Clara players
Esteghlal F.C. players
Persian Gulf Pro League players
Primeira Liga players
Iranian expatriate footballers
Expatriate footballers in Portugal
Iranian expatriate sportspeople in Portugal
21st-century Iranian people